The International Travel Catering Association, formerly the In Flight Catering Association was a trade association for travel catering.  They provided educational services, competitive awards (the Mercury Award) and published a regular magazine Onboard Hospitality. On May 7, 2014, the International Travel Catering Association announced it was liquidating its operations.

The ITCA endowed a chair in Production and Operations Management at the University of Surrey.

References

Traveling business organizations
Travel catering